The Aspiras–Palispis Highway (formerly known and still referred to as Marcos Highway or Agoo–Baguio Road) is a Philippine major highway in northern Luzon that runs from the city of Baguio in the province of Benguet to the municipality of Agoo in the province of La Union.

The  highway traverses the municipality of Tuba and the city of Baguio in Benguet, and the municipalities of Pugo, Tubao, and Agoo in La Union.

It is one of the four main roads used by motorists and travelers to access Baguio from the northwestern lowlands of Luzon. The highway's several rehabilitation and development efforts led to the road's categorization as an "all-weather road", and is the preferred highway by motorists to use over the older Kennon Road.

The entire highway is designated as National Route 208 (N208) of the Philippine highway network.

History
Marcos Highway was renamed into Aspiras–Palispis Highway on October 31, 2000, with the issuance of Republic Act 8971. The highway section covering the province of Benguet was designated as the Ben Palispis Highway in honor of former Benguet Governor Ben Palispis. The La Union section of Marcos Highway was named Jose D. Aspiras Highway after former La Union assemblyman and Tourism Minister Jose Aspiras. However, the former name is considered by people to be more familiar and is still preferred by most.

The Palina Bridge, situated along the Benguet–La Union boundary, serves as the boundary between the two highways.

Intersections

Notable landmarks
Several meters from it is a concrete rock shed to protect motorists from landslides.

The blasted remains of the bust of Ferdinand Marcos, a giant concrete head sculpture of the former president, can be seen along the highway at Barangay Palina, in Pugo, La Union.

References

Roads in Benguet
Roads in La Union